Project Halitosis was a 1965 undertaking by the United States Air Force to study the amount of radioactive gases released from their experimental nuclear-powered bomber program. The heavily modified NB-36H bomber contained a small, open-circuit nuclear reactor to test the physical and radiological stresses it placed on the airframe and was not used for power. The radioactive gases released from the air-cooled reactor gave the program its "bad breath" reference. The project was part of the U.S. Air Force's Aircraft Nuclear Propulsion project which operated between 1950 and 1967.

External links
 Cortright, Vincent, "Dream of Atomic Powered Flight", Aviation History, March 1995

Projects of the United States Air Force
Nuclear history of the United States